Elections in Kuwait are held for both the National Assembly and for the Municipality. Kuwait's constitution calls for elections to the unicameral National Assembly at a maximum interval of four years. Elections are held earlier if the Constitutional Court or Emir dissolve the parliament.

Electoral districts

Kuwait was divided into five districts in the National Assembly elections between 1963 and 1975. Each district elected ten deputies to the Assembly. Before the 1981 elections the government redistricted Kuwait, creating a system of 25 districts. Following the redistricting, fewer Shi'ite candidates won seats in the Assembly. This was a deliberate result of the redistricting, and it followed the 1979 Revolution in Iran. Each of the 25 districts elected two members to the National Assembly, for a total of 50 elected members (additional members sit as appointed members of the cabinet).

Political blocs
While political groups and parliamentary voting blocs exist, most candidates run as independents. Once elected, many deputies form voting blocs in the National Assembly. While Kuwaiti law does not recognize political parties, numerous political groups function as de facto political parties in elections, and there are blocs in the parliament. Major de facto political parties include: National Democratic Alliance, Popular Action Bloc, Hadas (Kuwaiti Muslim Brotherhood), National Islamic Alliance and Justice and Peace Alliance.

Election history
The earliest modern elections in Kuwait were held in 1921. Elections were held again in June and then in December 1938 for a majlis al-tashri'i, or Legislative Council. The ruling family dissolved the second Council in 1939. Following independence in 1961 elections were held in 1962 to elect 20 members to the constitutional convention.

Suffrage
Kuwait has universal adult suffrage for Kuwaiti citizens who are 21 or older. The constitution bars members of the ruling family from running for election to the National Assembly, though the constitution does not explicitly prohibit these members of the ruling family from casting votes. The franchise was expanded to include women in 2005. When voting was first introduced in Kuwait in 1985, Kuwaiti women had the right to vote. This right was later removed. In 2005, Kuwaiti women were re-granted the right to vote.

Kuwait's citizenship law, in theory, gives citizenship to those who descend, in the male line, from residents of Kuwait in 1920.

See also
Politics of Kuwait

References

External links
 Kuwait Politics Database